Andy or Andrew O'Brien may refer to:

 Andy O'Brien (footballer) (born 1979), Irish footballer
 Andy O'Brien (hurler) (born 1988), Irish hurler
 Andy O'Brien (journalist) (1910–1987), Canadian sports journalist
 Andy O'Brien (politician) (1915–2006), Irish Fine Gael senator
 Andrew O'Brien (politician) (fl. 1990s-2010s), US Department of State official
 Andrew O'Brien (rugby) (1897–1969), New Zealand rugby footballer

Fictional 
 Andy O'Brien (EastEnders), a character in EastEnders